Shestaki is the name of several rural localities in Russia:
Shestaki, Beryozovsky District, Perm Krai, a village in Beryozovsky District, Perm Krai
Shestaki, Gubakhinsky Urban okrug, a settlement in Gubakhinsky Urban okrug